José Roca may refer to:

 José Segundo Roca (1800-1865), Argentine colonel
 José Roca y Ponsa (1852-1938), Spanish Roman Catholic priest
 José Antonio Roca (1928-2007), Mexican footballer
 José Manuel Roca (born 1976), Spanish footballer